Leonardo Lavalle and Mike Leach were the defending champions, but Lavalle did not participate this year.  Leach partnered Gary Donnelly, losing in the first round.

Rick Leach and Jim Pugh won the title, defeating Dan Goldie and Mel Purcell 6–3, 6–2 in the final.

Seeds

  Gary Donnelly /  Mike Leach (first round)
  Kevin Curren /  Mike De Palmer (first round)
  Andy Kohlberg /  Robert Van't Hof (quarterfinals)
  Rick Leach /  Jim Pugh (champions)

Draw

Draw

External links
 Main draw

Tennis Channel Open
1987 Grand Prix (tennis)